Block of People's Democratic Parties "We Know HOW!" was a political alliance that took part in the parliamentary elections 2006. It did not overcome the 3% threshold (winning only 0.49% of the votes) and therefore won no seats in the Ukrainian Parliament.

The alliance had the following members:
People's Democratic Party
Democratic Party of Ukraine
Christian Democratic Party of Ukraine
Christian Liberal Party of Ukraine

References

Defunct political party alliances in Ukraine